Kali Jotta is a 2023 Indian Punjabi-language crime-drama film directed by Vijay Kumar Arora, written by Harinder Kour and starring Satinder Sartaaj, Neeru Bajwa and Wamiqa Gabbi.

Cast 
 Satinder Sartaaj as Deedar
 Neeru Bajwa as Rabia
 Wamiqa Gabbi as Anant
 Prince Kanwaljit Singh as Boota
 Nikita Grover as Goldy
 Roopi Rupinder as Gurinder
 Gurpreet Bhangu as Teacher
 Anita Devgan as Mental Person

Release

Theatrical
The film was released on 3 February 2023 in Cinemas.

Music 
Beat  Minister has composed the music and Raju Singh has given the background score of the film while the film's lead Sartaaj has penned the lyrics.

Reception

Critical Response
Neha Vashist of The Times of India gave 4 stars out 5 and said, “Neeru Bajwa’s acting prowess and Vijay Kumar Arora’s directorial expertise combined to make a heart-wrenching cinematic piece.”

Shivam Madaan of Hindustan Metro rated the film 4.5 out of 5 stars and said, “The concept and storyline of the movie is untouched and unique for Punjabi Cinema. Bajwa is at her best and her  gives goosebumps to the audiences. Sartaaj did fully justice to his character as Deedar. Wamiqa Gabbi practiced her craft so well that we cannot blink our eyes when she is on screen.”

Sukhpreet Kahlon of The Indian Express rated the film 4 out of 5 stars and said, “The commendable performances in the film bring the story alive with every actor playing their part with precision. Neeru Bajwa displays an impressive emotional depth and maturity.”

Kiddaan.com, rated the film 4 stars out of 5 and said, “This story is unique and was much required in the Punjabi Film Industry. The film focuses on crime against women. Sartaaj’s acting looked very natural in every frame and Wamiqa made sure to keep everything in place. This film did not really have many impactful and remarkable dialogues.”

References

External links 
 
2023 films
Punjabi-language films

Indian crime drama films